System Information (msinfo32.exe) is a system profiler included with Microsoft Windows that displays diagnostic and troubleshooting information related to the operating system, hardware and software. It has been bundled with Windows since Windows NT 4.0.

It compiles technical information on the overall system, hardware resources (including memory, I/O, etc.), physical hardware components (CD-ROM, sound, network, etc.), and the Windows environment as well (drivers, environment variables, services, etc.). It can export this information in the plain text format or in files with a .nfo extension, which can be used to diagnose problems. In addition, System Information can be used to gather technical information on a remote computer on the same network.

See also
Systeminfo.exe
MSConfig

References

Windows components